Felicity Elizabeth Passon (born 11 July 1999) is a Seychellois swimmer. She competed in the women's 50 metre freestyle at the 2019 World Aquatics Championships. She represented Seychelles at the 2019 African Games, winning two gold medals, one silver medal and one bronze medal, and qualified for the Tokyo 2020 Olympics.

She competes at the collegiate level for the University of Arizona.

References

External links
 

1999 births
Living people
Seychellois female swimmers
Place of birth missing (living people)
Swimmers at the 2019 African Games
African Games medalists in swimming
African Games gold medalists for Seychelles
African Games silver medalists for Seychelles
African Games bronze medalists for Seychelles
Seychellois female freestyle swimmers
Swimmers at the 2020 Summer Olympics
Olympic swimmers of Seychelles
Arizona Wildcats women's swimmers
SMU Mustangs women's swimmers